Ulysses is a 1988 sculpture by Alexander Liberman, installed outside Los Angeles' Mellon Bank Center, in the U.S. state of California.

See also 

 1988 in art

References 

1988 sculptures
Bunker Hill, Los Angeles
Outdoor sculptures in Greater Los Angeles
Sculptures by Alexander Liberman